Deaf Sam-yong (Beongeori Samryong) is a 1964 South Korean drama film directed, produced by Shin Sang-ok, based on the 1925 short story of the same title by Na Do-hyang. It was chosen as Best Film at the Grand Bell Awards. The film was also selected as the South Korean entry for the Best Foreign Language Film at the 37th Academy Awards, but was not accepted as a nominee.

It was previously filmed as Beongeoli Sam-ryong in 1929 by Na Woon-gyu.

Plot
A deaf farmhand is in love with the landlord's daughter-in-law.

Cast
Kim Jin-kyu
Choi Eun-hee
Park No-sik
Do Kum-bong
Choi Nam-hyun
Han Eun-jin
Choe Seong-ho
Seo Wol-yeong
Park Jin-hyeon
Jeong Deuk-sun

See also
List of submissions to the 37th Academy Awards for Best Foreign Language Film
List of South Korean submissions for the Academy Award for Best Foreign Language Film

References

Bibliography

External links

1964 drama films
South Korean drama films
1960s Korean-language films
Best Picture Grand Bell Award winners
Films about deaf people
Films based on short fiction
Films directed by Shin Sang-ok
Films about disability